The 2010 Kazakhstan Cup was the 17th season of the Kazakhstan Cup, the annual nationwide football cup competition of Kazakhstan since the independence of the country. The competition started on 9 April 2008 and finished with the Final played on 16 November 2008. The winners of the Cup earned a place in second qualifying round of the 2009–10 UEFA Europa League.

First round
The first round involved 28 teams. When the draw was conducted teams were divided into three pots to avoid matches between the strongest clubs in the early stage of competition. The matches were played on April 9, 2008.

|}

Round of 16
The matches were played on April 23, 2008.

|}

Quarterfinals
The quarterfinal matches were played on May 7 (first legs) and May 14, 2008 (second legs).

|}

Semifinals
The first legs were played on October 28 and second on November 12, 2008.

|}
The expulsion of FC Vostok, assessed on September 16, 2008 by the Football Federation of Kazakhstan for taking part in a fixed match, was revoked on October 2, 2008.

Final

External links
 Official site 
 Kazakhstan Cup on rsssf.com

References

2008
2008 domestic association football cups
Cup